Glaucoclystis spinosa is a species of moth in the family Geometridae. It is found in Japan.

References

Moths described in 1971
Eupitheciini
Moths of Japan